Saint Juvenal of Benevento (died 132 AD) is a 2nd-century saint honored in Narni, Italy. His shrine is in Benevento, Italy and his feast day is May 7.

References

132 deaths
2nd-century Christian saints
Italian saints
Year of birth unknown